José Antonio Cruz Oliva is a Honduran sociologist. Cruz Oliva holds a doctorate in sociology from the University of the Basque Country.

Cruz Oliva was one of the leaders of the Movement for Socialism (MAS), a left-wing faction of the Christian Democratic Party of Honduras in the 1970s.

In the 2013 general election Cruz Oliva stood as a candidate for parliament for the Democratic Unification Party (UD) in Francisco Morazán. He obtained 6,218 votes.

References

Honduran sociologists
Democratic Unification Party politicians
Living people
Year of birth missing (living people)